In organic chemistry, a semicarbazone is a derivative of imines formed by a condensation reaction between a ketone or aldehyde and semicarbazide.  They are classified as imine derivatives because they are formed from the reaction of an aldehyde or ketone with the terminal -NH2 group of semicarbazide, which behaves very similarly to primary amines.

Formation
For ketones
H2NNHC(=O)NH2 + RC(=O)R → R2C=NNHC(=O)NH2

For aldehydes 
H2NNHC(=O)NH2 + RCHO → RCH=NNHC(=O)NH2

For example, the semicarbazone of acetone would have the structure (CH3)2C=NNHC(=O)NH2.

Properties and uses
Some semicarbazones, such as nitrofurazone, and thiosemicarbazones are known to have anti-viral and anti-cancer activity, usually mediated through binding to copper or iron in cells.  Many semicarbazones are crystalline solids, useful for the identification of the parent aldehydes/ketones by melting point analysis.

A thiosemicarbazone is an analog of a semicarbazone which contains a sulfur atom in place of the oxygen atom.

See also 
 Carbazone
 Carbazide
 Thiosemicarbazone

References

External links 
 Compounds Containing a N-CO-N-N or More Complex Group

Functional groups
Semicarbazones